San Vincenzo Martire di Craco (San Vincenzo Martyr of Craco) is a minor saint of the Roman Catholic Church. He is remembered in devotions by the people of Craco in the province of Matera, the Basilicata Region, Italy along with immigrants and their descendants from that town who settled in North America. San Vincenzo Martire di Craco's feast day is celebrated on the fourth Sunday of October in Craco, Italy and Manhattan, New York.

History
San Vincenzo is said to have been one of the Theban Legion, a legion of soldiers who converted en masse to Christianity and who were martyred for refusal to participate in sacrifices to the Roman emperor prior to battle in the year 286 AD.

Devotion 
The village of Craco, in the modern province of Matera, is the site of a former friary of the Franciscans.  The building of the friary began on April 3, 1620 by a Roberto, then Bishop of Tricarico, and was finally completed in 1630.  The Friary bore the name of St. Peter, and was entrusted to the care of the Franciscan Friars who retained it until the Italian Government suppressed it in 1866.

Next to this friary was a  church to the left of which, in 1777, a rather large chapel was built.  This chapel was dedicated to San Vincenzo Martire in the year 1793.

On February 6, 1769, a small bone relic of San Vincenzo was sent to Craco from Rome.  Then in 1792, Fr. Prospero, a Franciscan from Craco, finding himself in Rome, and wishing to return home with a relic of some glorious martyr, obtained from Pope Pius VI, through the Sacred Congregation of Rites, a relic which was said to be that of a Roman soldier as well as a glorious martyr, by the name of Vincenzo – a name signifying "winner" or "conqueror."  The "sacred body with a flask of blood" of San Vincenzo Martire was exhumed at the cemetery of St. Ciriaca, in Rome. Fr. Prospero enclosed the precious relic in an artistic crystal-sided casket.  Inside the casket was set the waxen body of the martyr, dressed as a Roman soldier and lying in a reclining position.

Stopping at various places during the course of its journey from Rome, the remains were carried all the way to Craco where it was received with great pomp and honor by the local clergy and townspeople.  The great devotion of the faithful in the region and neighboring towns rendered great honor to the soldier martyr San Vincenzo.  In large measure, this was due to the many miracles reportedly performed by the Saint for the suffering multitudes that sought his help.

The holy relic of San Vincenzo arrived in Craco on June 4, 1792. The clergy and the people of Craco decided to choose San Vincenzo, along with San Nicola of Bari, as their patron and protector of the town.  The religious and civil festival of San Vincenzo was fixed for the fourth Sunday of October to coincide with the important annual fair which takes place after the harvest.  On April 4, 1793 the relic of San Vincenzo was installed in the chapel at the Friary and remained there until the late 1980s when structural instability required the relic to be relocated to a small chapel in the Sant'Angelo section of Craco where it resides today.  Although the Friary dedicated to St. Peter served as his home, the overwhelming majority of the population of Craco still calls it "the Convent of San Vincenzo."

Feast of San Vincenzo
Traditionally, the feast in Craco celebrating San Vincenzo began nine days before the fourth Sunday in October with the recitation of solemn afternoon novenas. On one of those evenings, a small procession took place, with a statue representing the upright figure of the relic, starting from the Chapel and moving around the "Cross", then located at the entrance to the town. On Friday evening, after the novena, the statue of the saint was brought into the Chiesa Madre [Church of San Nicola] located in the heart of the old town. On Saturday evening, before the feast day, the statue was carried in procession back to the chapel that served as its home. All celebrations culminated on Sunday with the Mass at the Friary and the procession that crossed the entire town. That evening, in front of the Palazzo Rigirone, there were bright fireworks displays.

Fair
The feast in honor of San Vincenzo was always preceded on the Saturday before by a fair, a proud tradition carried out since the end of the 18th century until today. The fair, traditionally known by all the nearby people and neighboring towns, brought many people from Salandra, Fernandina, Montalbano and Pisticci.  The fair branched from the entrance of Craco to the other end of the town, at the drinking trough.  It was held at the time of the year when workers of the earth were engaged in preparing land for planting or harvesting olives. But on that day, all work ceased so the people could make major purchases at the fair. Animals of all types, as well as foodstuffs: dried beans, "winter" apples, and dried peppers that would be used to season salami were available. This served as a way for people to purchase provisions for the long winter that awaited the rural population.

Confraternity of San Vincenzo Martire
Until the early decades of the 20th century a confraternity of devout worshippers of San Vincenzo existed in Craco. Those belonging to the confraternity were characterized by wearing a white tunic with a turquoise cape and belt. This group took part in the Mass, processions, and upon request also at funerals.

San Vincenzo Martire in New York
With immigration to northern America at the turn of the 20th century, the Crachesi brought the devotion to their patron saint with them. In 1899 they formed a mutual aid society, the Società San Vincenzo Martire di Craco, in New York City.

One of the founding members of the Società, Pasquale Marrese had a tailor shop in Manhattan and employed several fellow townspeople along with family members.  They fashioned a copy of the San Vincenzo relic using a woodcut print image that had been carried from Craco of the saint.  
  
Meanwhile, another member of the Società was dispatched to Craco to obtain a copy of the novena so it could be used in America for the feast day celebration.  That individual also returned with the bone reliquary from 1769 that had been kept in Craco.

In 1901 this group associated itself with St. Joachim's Church,  providing the church with a statue that is a copy of the reclining relic of San Vincenzo in Craco, the 1769 bone relic from Craco, and a handwritten copy of the original novena as said in Craco. The first celebration of the feast of San Vincenzo Martire in New York City's Little Italy was held on Saturday and Sunday October 24–25, 1901. The Societa San Vincenzo Martire di Craco continued to maintain the traditional celebration of the feast on the fourth Sunday of October and was always preceded by a large banquet the evening before.  The last celebration sponsored by the Società was in October 1941. With the onset of World War II, the celebration of the feast was suspended although the religious celebration of a special Mass continued. In 1952, the Società San Vincenzo Martire di Craco was dissolved. 

Individual devotees, all descendants of the Crachesi immigrants, continued sponsoring the religious celebration of a special Mass for San Vincenzo Martire at St. Joachim's Church.  In 1957, an urban renewal project, ordered by the City of New York, dictated the closing of the church in 1958, and required the relocation of the statues before the church was demolished.

The statue, which is a copy of the reclining relic of San Vincenzo in Craco, and the bone relic from 1769 were relocated to the Church of St. Joseph, 5 Monroe Street, Manhattan where arrangements were made for the religious celebration of a special Mass annually.  The upright processional statue was placed at St. Rosalia – Regina Pacis Parish in Brooklyn, but was lost to the effects of time.

St. Joseph's Church maintained the annual feast day celebration holding a special Mass on the fourth Sunday in October through 2014.  In 2016 the Archdiocese of New York reorganized the parish structure closing St. Joseph's Church on July 31.

The historic statue of San Vincenzo and relic were relocated to the Shrine Church of the Most Precious Blood, also in Manhattan.  It resides there along with several historic Italian American statues of patron saints and the annual feast day continues to be celebrated there.

References

Sources
 A Brief Sketch of the Life of San Vincenzo Martire, Translated and Adapted by Fr. Regis Gallo, O.F.M.
 Cenni Storici di San Vincenzo Martire e sua Devozione a Craco, Don Leonardo Rocco Rosano and Marco Letagana, I.M.D. Lucania, Pisticci, c. 1980.
 San Vincenzo: un Martire a Craco, Domenica Mormando and Palmina Vignola, a publication of the Associazione Colibri,  I.M.D. Lucania, Pisticci, 2005.
 New York Times, October 28, 1901, Wednesday, Page 7.

External links
 Official website of the Craco Society

Catholic martyrs
3rd-century Christian martyrs
Year of birth unknown